In a web browser, an access key or accesskey allows a computer user to immediately jump to a specific web page via the keyboard. They were introduced in 1999 and quickly achieved near-universal browser support.

In the summer of 2002, a Canadian Web Accessibility consultancy did an informal survey to see if implementing accesskeys caused issues for users of adaptive technology, especially screen reading technology used by blind and low vision users. These users require numerous keyboard shortcuts to access web pages, as “pointing and clicking” a mouse is not an option for them. Their research showed that most key stroke combinations did in fact present a conflict for one or more of these technologies, and their final recommendation was to avoid using accesskeys altogether.

In XHTML 2, a revised web authoring language, the HTML Working Group of the World Wide Web Consortium deprecated the accesskey attribute in favor of the XHTML Role Access Module.  However, XHTML 2 has been retired in favor of HTML5, which (as of August 2009) continues to permit accesskeys.

Access in different browsers
For a more complete list of which browsers support the HTML Access keys, please see how they are compared in the comparison of web browsers.

Conflicting access keys
If multiple identical accesskeys are assigned within the same document, IE will tab through them on each keypress (IE will tab backwards if  is pressed as well). This way, elements can be logically grouped in various accesskey rings for easier navigation. IE 4.0 only supported letters of the English alphabet as accesskeys. Firefox 2.0 will activate the last of a group of elements assigned the same accesskey.

Specifying access keys
Access keys are specified in HTML using the accesskey attribute. The value of an element’s accesskey attribute is the key the user will press (typically in combination with one or more other keys, as defined by the browser) in order to activate or focus that element. Though the accesskey attribute sets the key that can be pressed, it does not automatically notify the user of the bound access key. One convention is for the page author to show the access key value by using the <u> tag to underline the letter in the link’s text corresponding to the accesskey assigned. For the link below, a user would press + on Internet Explorer, + on a Mac (the command key can give undesired results) and ++ on Opera to be directed to index.html.

 <a href="index.html" accesskey="h">Home</a>

or to emphasize ‹H›:

 <a href="index.html" accesskey="h"><em>H</em>ome</a>

alternatively, the following CSS can be used to indicate the character:
 *[accesskey]:after {content:' [' attr(accesskey) ']'}
Emphasize <em> isn’t necessary, but can be useful to the user. It helps them identify which key to press to navigate to where they want to. Another possible way of displaying which accesskeys do what is to create a page with all the accesskeys displayed. Or the webmaster could do both.  Another option for the end user is to install a user script such as FireFox Access Bar for GreaseMonkey.

Use of standard access key mappings
In 2004, a standard emerged using numbers, which promotes consistency for users, and enables the increased predictability of keyboard shortcuts on different sites. These include, for example, 1 to go to the homepage, 0 for search, / for contact, and others..

Ten years later, in 2014, an updated and more comprehensive standard using both letters and numbers was released  in order to breathe new life into browser access key standardization efforts.

See also
 Keyboard shortcuts

References

External links
 A bug report for the MediaWiki software regarding conflicts with Accesskeys – includes lengthy discussion of various problems on different platforms
 A CSS stylesheet to make access keys on a website visible
 ACCESS + KEY = Accesskey (XHTML Role Access Module still flawed)
 Accesskeys and Reserved Keystroke Combinations 	
 Changes to Accesskeys in Firefox 2.0
 Ui.key.contentAccess – instructions on configuring access key behavior in Mozilla Firefox
 UK Government suggested numerical key standard
 User-defined Accesskeys using PHP
 Using Accesskeys is Easy
 SAK2014: Standard Access Keys 2014

Computer keys
Web accessibility